Ryszard Tomaszewski (born 20 August 1951) is a retired Polish Paralympic powerlifter, discus thrower and shot putter. He was a triple Paralympic champion in powerlifting and a two-time medalist in athletics.

Life changing accident
In 1971, he was involved in an accident at work in Żelazno where he and a team of other geologists went to research the construction of a bridge near the town. A 800kg chisel from a drilling tower fell onto him and a drill technician, the mechanical instrument hit the technician on the head and hit Tomaszewski's back. The pier that they both stood on collapsed and they fell into the water. They were both rescued from the water but they were both unconscious, the technician had lost a lot of blood from the accident but Tomaszewski had a suspected broken vertebra. The two casualties were thrown into the back of a car and were taken to hospital in Kłodzko, halfway through the journey, the technician was taken by ambulance and went to the nearest hospital while Tomaszewski was still in the car, he described the road as very bumpy and the car was travelling very fast. Once he reached to the nearest hospital, the doctor who examined him confirmed that he had suffered a spinal cord injury.

Tomaszewski was in an induced coma in a hospital in Wrocław to receive treatment and received rehabilitation in Konstancin.

References

1951 births
Living people
Paralympic powerlifters of Poland
Paralympic athletes of Poland
Polish male discus throwers
Polish male shot putters
Athletes (track and field) at the 1984 Summer Paralympics
Powerlifters at the 1988 Summer Paralympics
Powerlifters at the 1992 Summer Paralympics
Powerlifters at the 1996 Summer Paralympics
Powerlifters at the 2000 Summer Paralympics
Medalists at the 1980 Summer Paralympics
Medalists at the 1984 Summer Paralympics
Medalists at the 1988 Summer Paralympics
Medalists at the 1992 Summer Paralympics
Medalists at the 1996 Summer Paralympics
Wheelchair discus throwers
Wheelchair shot putters
Paralympic discus throwers
Paralympic shot putters